Santa Clarita Blue Heat is an American women's soccer team, founded in 2008. The club was known as the Ventura County Fusion for its first two years of existence.

The team plays its home games at Canyon High School. During the Fusion days, they played at Bulldog Stadium on the grounds of Buena High School in the city of Ventura, California.

The team had been a sis organization of the men's Ventura County Fusion team, which plays in the Premier Development League.

The Blue Heat  was a member of the United Soccer Leagues USL W-League, the second tier of women's soccer in the United States and Canada. In 2016 the team joined the United Women's Soccer (UWS). The Blue Heat won the first UWS championship by defeating New Jersey Copa FC 2-1 in Santa Clarita on July 30, 2016.

Players

Notable former players
Edite Fernandes - Portugal
Deyna Castellanos - Venezuela
Ana Boeges - Portugal
Carolina Venegas - Costa Rica
Julia Hernandez - Spain
Ashley Sanchez - USA
Lauren Sesselmann - USA/Canada
Natalia Kuikka - Finland
Evi Popadinova - Bulgaria

Year-by-year

References

External links
 
 Santa Clarita Blue Heat on United Women's Soccer

   

Soccer clubs in Greater Los Angeles
Women's soccer clubs in the United States
USL W-League (1995–2015) teams
Santa Clarita, California
2008 establishments in California
United Women's Soccer teams
Association football clubs established in 2008